The Iranian National Formulary (INF) has  more than 2,300 molecules registered at the Iran's Ministry of Health, including various strengths and dosage forms. The standards regarding pharmaceutical products in Iran are determined and modified by the Pharmacopeia Council.

Iran has adopted a full generic-based National Drug Policy (NDP), with local production of essential drugs and vaccines as one of the main goals. Formalities for approval of a new molecule can take between 1 month and 12 months (maximum), as follows:

 1 month: for new strength/dosage form of any registered/approved product; 
 3 to 7 months: for any new product to the INF list.

Top 20 drug molecules and sales in Iran

See also
Pharmaceuticals in Iran

References

Healthcare in Iran